"Fine by Me" is the second single by American recording artist Andy Grammer from his debut studio album Andy Grammer (2011). The song was co-written and produced by Matt Radosevich. It was released in December 2011. "Fine by Me" debuted at #87 on the Billboard Hot 100 and reached the top 10 on the Adult Pop Songs chart. A live version was included on his live album, Live From L.A., featuring guest vocals from Colbie Caillat.

Music video
The music video published for "Fine by Me" was released February 15, 2012. It depicts singer Andy Grammer ignoring his girlfriend, portrayed by model Dominique Piek  but getting her back by recording his song on her iPod.

Charts

Weekly charts

Year-end charts

Certifications

References

2011 singles
2011 songs
Andy Grammer songs
Songs written by Matt Rad
Songs written by Andy Grammer
Warner Records singles
Song recordings produced by Matt Rad